The Democratic Union Party was a political party in Cuba. The party was founded in 1899 by conservative sectors. In an alliance with the Republican Party of Havana, the DUP won the Constitutional Assembly elections in 1900. The DUP was dissolved in 1901.

References

Defunct political parties in Cuba
Political parties established in 1899
Political parties disestablished in 1901
1899 establishments in Cuba
1901 disestablishments in Cuba